Chicago is a ghost town in Adell Township, Sheridan County, Kansas, United States.

History
The community was named after Chicago, Illinois because it was the busiest place in the local area.  A joint post office, stagecoach stop, and general store opened in 1880.  The post office only lasted until 1887.  A church built in 1910 lasted until the early 1960s, and the local school closed in 1954.

Currently, what remained of the community is an abandoned schoolhouse, a rusty "Chicago" sign marker, and the foundation of an abandoned home.

References

Further reading

External links
 1965 photograph of church and school, Kansasmemory.com
 Sheridan County maps: Current, Historic, KDOT